Errol "E.T." Webster (born c. 1945) is a Jamaican reggae singer active since the 1960s, but best known for his roots reggae releases since the 1980s.

Biography
Born in Montego Bay, Webster began singing in the 1960s and joined Billy Vernon and the Celestials in 1967 after a successful audition. The group toured the North coast hotel circuit in Jamaica and Webster also toured California with the band in 1969, and provided lead vocals on the band's debut album. In the 1970s he was a member of the New Breed and began a solo career, becoming a popular cabaret artist.

Webster's best known work is his material recorded since the mid-1980s including the Jamaican number one single "Can We Meet" and work with producers Norman Grant of the Twinkle Brothers and later Ocho Rios-based Barry O'Hare, which has resulted in several albums, primarily comprising roots reggae.

Webster suffered a stroke in 2008, which restricted his movement and he now uses a wheelchair. He has continued to record, including the Inner Path album in 2011. He was honoured at the 2011 Reggae Sumfest festival with the 'Reggae Icon' award.

Discography
Hit A-Boom (1984), Twinkle
Music is Life (1987), Sonic Sounds
Musical Explosion (1990), Sonic Sounds
Twinkle Sample volume 1 (1990), Twinkle – split with Twinkle Brothers
Twinkle Sample volume 2 (1990), Twinkle – split with Twinkle Brothers
Changes (1990), Twinkle
Reflections (1993), Imp
Lament of a Dread (1993), Twinkle
Mankind (1996), Twinkle
Freedom Fighter (1998), Runn
Colour You (2002), Mr & Ms
Inner Path (2010), Mr & Ms
Sings Golden Hits (2011), Mr & Ms

References

1940s births
Living people
Jamaican male singers
Jamaican reggae musicians